Deep Narayan Singh Yadav alias Deepak Dadda (born 21 July 1969) is an Indian politician who is a former member of the Uttar Pradesh Legislative Assembly from the Garautha Assembly constituency since 2007 to 2017, won over the symbol of Samajwadi Party.

References 

Year of birth missing (living people)
Living people